Farquharson ( or ) is a surname of Scottish origin, and may refer to:

Alex Farquharson (born 1969), British curator and art critic, Director of Tate Britain
Alexander Farquharson (1864–1951), Scottish doctor, barrister, soldier and politician
Sir Angus Farquharson of Finzean (1935–2018), Scottish pioneer in sustainable rural community development, Lord Lieutenant of Aberdeenshire 1998–2010
Ashley Farquharson (born 1999), American luger
Cali Farquharson (born 1993), American soccer player
David Farquharson (1839–1907), Scottish landscape painter
Donald Farquharson (disambiguation), several people
Francis Farquharson (architect) (1805–1878), Scottish architect/builder
Francis Farquharson (1837–1875), Scottish soldier, recipient of the Victoria Cross
Graham Farquharson (1940–2022), Canadian mining engineer
Henry Richard Farquharson (1857–1895) English politician
Henry Farquharson (1675–1739) Scottish-Russian mathematician 
Hugh Farquharson (1911–1985), Canadian Olympic ice hockey player
James Farquharson (1781–1843), Scottish minister, meteorologist and scientific writer
John Farquharson (disambiguation), several people
Jordan Farquharson (born 2000), Bahamian footballer
Joseph Farquharson (1846–1935), Scottish landscape painter
Lady Anne Farquharson-MacKintosh (1723–1787), Scottish Jacobite of the Clan Farquharson
Marian Farquharson (1846–1912), British naturalist and women's rights activist
Martha Durward Farquharson (1847–1929), Irish-born Australian hospital matron and owner
Mary Farquharson (1901–1982), American politician
May Farquharson (1894–1992), Jamaican social worker, birth control advocate, philanthropist and reformer
Nick Farquharson (born 1988), English professional football player
Norman Farquharson (1907–1992) South African tennis player
Priestley Farquharson (born 1997), English footballer
Ray Farquharson (1897–1965), Canadian doctor, university professor and medical researcher
Robert Farquharson (politician) (1836–1918), Scottish doctor and politician
Robert Farquharson, stage name of Robin de la Condamine (1877–1966), English actor
Robert Farquharson (born 1969), Australian murderer
Robin Farquharson (1930–1973), British mathematician working on game theory.
Samantha Farquharson (born 1969), English athlete
Tom Farquharson (1900–1970), Irish professional football player
Tom Farquharson (tennis) (born 1992), British tennis player
Walter H. Farquharson (born 1936), Moderator of the United Church of Canada and hymn writer
William Farquharson (disambiguation), several people
Zimmorlei Farquharson (born 2002), Australian rules footballer

See also
Clan Farquharson
Farquharson rifle
Farquhar (disambiguation)